Irish Lad (1900–1925) was an American Thoroughbred Champion racehorse and a world record holder.

Background
Irish Lad was bred by H. Eugene Leigh. In the fall of 1901 Leigh sold the yearling to John Madden for $2,550. Madden conditioned him for racing and brought him to the track in the spring of 1902.

Racing career
Irish Lad showed enough potential that Herman Duryea and Harry Whitney paid $17,500 for him. Racing under the partners nom de course,  Westbury Stable, and still trained by John Madden, Irish Lad won important races such as the Great Trial Stakes at Sheepshead Bay Race Track and the Saratoga Special Stakes. His 1902 performances earned him retrospective American Champion Two-Year-Old Colt honors.

As a three-year-old, Irish Lad's training was taken over by John W. Rogers. His biggest win of 1903 came on May 28 in the Brooklyn Handicap at Gravesend Race Track in which he set a new stakes record time. Irish Lad set a new track record at Saratoga Race Course in winning the Saratoga Champion Stakes in a time of 2:05 flat for a mile and one-quarter.

In May 1904, four-year-old Irish Lad won the prestigious Metropolitan Handicap at Morris Park Racecourse then on June 26 at the Sheepshead Bay Race Track he set a world record of 2:17.60 for a mile and three eighths on dirt in winning the Advance Stakes over what the New York Times described as five of the best horses in the United States. Irish Lad came out of the July 9 Brighton Handicap badly lame and was retired 
 but in May 1905 it was announced that he was back in training. In June 1905 Irish Lad finished ninth in an all-age handicap at Gravesend Race Track  and shortly thereafter was retired to stud.

Stud record
Irish Lad had sired only a few horses while at stud in the United States when the Legislature of New York passed the Hart–Agnew anti-betting law that resulted in the complete shutdown of racing. As a consequence, Irish Lad, along with other horses owned by Duryea such as Frizette, were sent to his newly acquired Haras du Gazon stud farm in Neuvy-au-Houlme in Lower Normandy, France. There, he also met with limited success but did notably sire Banshee, winner of the 1913 Poule d'Essai des Pouliches (French 1000 Guineas) and Pellsie who won the 1919 Prix de Diane (French Oaks).

Irish Lad died Haras du Gazon in 1925 of old age.

References
 Irish Lad's pedigree and partial racing stats

1900 racehorse births
1925 racehorse deaths
Racehorses bred in Kentucky
Racehorses trained in the United States
American Champion racehorses
Horse racing track record setters
Thoroughbred family A22